The Swiftcurrent Auto Camp Historic District preserves a portion of the built-up area of Glacier National Park that documents the second phase of tourist development in the park.  After the creation of a series of hotels for train-borne visitors including the nearby Many Glacier Hotel, courtesy of the Great Northern Railway's hotel concession, facilities were developed for the increasing numbers of automobile-borne tourists, drawn to Glacier by the Going-to-the-Sun Road. The Swiftcurrent Auto Camp at Swiftcurrent Lake was created for these new tourists. It includes a rustic general store, built in 1935 by the Glacier Park Hotel Company, surrounded by a number of log tourist cabins., as well as a shower and laundry house and other supporting structures.

In contrast to the prominent site of the nearby Many Glacier Hotel, the auto camp is located in stands of mature trees that block direct views of the surrounding mountains. The facilities were intended to provide an inexpensive, informal alternative to the hotels that had heretofore provided the bulk of tourist accommodations. The camp was built by the railroad's Glacier Park Hotel Company subsidiary, under pressure from the National Park Service to provide such accommodations.

See also
Rising Sun Auto Camp
Swiftcurrent Ranger Station Historic District

References

National Park Service rustic in Montana
Historic districts on the National Register of Historic Places in Montana
National Register of Historic Places in Glacier County, Montana
1996 establishments in Montana
National Register of Historic Places in Glacier National Park
Great Northern Railway (U.S.)
1935 establishments in Montana
Commercial buildings completed in 1935